Argyle Island is a river island in Chatham County, in the U.S. state of Georgia.

Argyle Island most likely derives its name from Archibald Campbell, 3rd Duke of Argyll.

References

Landforms of Chatham County, Georgia
River islands of Georgia (U.S. state)